Green Party leadership elections took place in the following countries during 2012:

2012 Green Party (Czech Republic) leadership election 
2012 Green Party of England and Wales leadership election 
2012 Green Party of Prince Edward Island leadership election

See also
2012 Green Party presidential primaries in the United States